Dame Cécile Ellen Fleurette La Grenade,  (born 30 December 1952) is a Grenadian food scientist who has served as Governor-General of Grenada since 7 May 2013.

Early life and career 
La Grenade was born in La Borie, located in Saint George Parish, Grenada.  She is the third of five daughters born to Allan A. La Grenade , a civil servant, and Sibyl Sylvester-La Grenade, a registered nurse. Her maternal grandmother, Mary Louise "Eva" Ollivierre-Sylvester, was the first woman in the British Windward Islands to serve on the legislative council of her country, after being elected in 1952, less than a year after universal suffrage. She is a paternal first cousin of Maurice Bishop, the Prime Minister of Grenada during the 1979-83 People's Revolutionary Government.<ref>{{Cite web|title= La Grenade "proud to be chosen as new Grenada GG|url= https://spiceislander.com/la-grenade-proud-to-be-chosen-as-new-grenada-gg/|url-status=live|access-date=2023-01-20|website=www.spiceislander.com}}</ref>
La Grenade is a food scientist trained in the United States. She holds a bachelor's degree in chemistry from the University of the West Indies, as well as a master's degree and doctorate in food science from the University of Maryland at College Park.

She became a member of the Caribbean Export Development Agency’s Steering Committee, serving as the OECS Private Sector Representative, in 2006. In 2007 she was appointed Chairman of the Public Service Commission by Governor-General Sir Daniel Williams, a position she held until 2010.

 Governor-General of Grenada 
La Grenade's appointment as governor-general of Grenada was announced during the same week as the death of Grenada's first female governor, Dame Hilda Bynoe. Bynoe was the goddaughter of La Grenade's maternal grandfather, Dr Cyril I. St Bernard Sylvester, an educator and public servant. La Grenade was made a Dame Grand Cross of the Order of Saint Michael and Saint George by Queen Elizabeth II on 11 July 2014.

As governor-general, La Grenade opened the new Grenadian Parliament building in 2018. That same year, following the 15-0 victory of the New National Party in the March general election, she exercised the royal prerogative by appointing members of the defeated National Democratic Congress to the Senate in order to provide a parliamentary opposition to the government. As patron of the Willie Redhead Foundation and the Grenada National Trust, she has been an outspoken supporter of the restoration of Grenada's built heritage, especially the viceregal residence of Government House and York House; the former seat of Parliament.

Upon the death of Queen Elizabeth II in September 2022, La Grenade became the first Grenadian governor-general to have served under two monarchs of Grenada. She said that the Queen served with "incomparable devotion", and that "her legacy of leadership and exemplary service shall live on indelibly". She also represented Grenada at the Queen's state funeral in the United Kingdom.

Honours
 
  Two Sicilian Royal Family: Knight Grand Cross of Justice of the Two Sicilian Royal Sacred Military Constantinian Order of Saint George
 
Dame Grand Cross with Collar of the Order of St Michael and St George
 Officer of the Order of the British Empire
 Dame of the Order of St John

References

Sources
 United Nations CEDAW/C/GRD/Q/1-5/Add.1 :Convention on the Elimination of All Forms of Discrimination against Women; Distr.: General, 4 November 2011; ADVANCE UNEDITED VERSION (p. 14)
 Shepherd, Verene A. (editor), Women in Caribbean History'' (Kingston: Ian Randle, 1999).

External links
Grenada Names First Female Governor General, Cecile La Grenade
Convention on the Elimination of All Forms of Discrimination against Women

1952 births
Dames Grand Cross of the Order of St Michael and St George
Dames of Justice of the Order of St John
Governors-General of Grenada
Grenadian people of Carriacouan descent
Officers of the Order of the British Empire
Living people
University of Maryland, College Park alumni
University of the West Indies alumni
People from Saint George Parish, Grenada
Food scientists